The Perfect Clown is a 1925 American silent slapstick comedy film starring Larry Semon and Kate Price. It features an early screen appearance by Oliver Hardy. Directed by Fred C. Newmeyer, the screenplay was written by Thomas J. Crizer, who also wrote the subtitles along with Charlie Saxton.

Plot
The story is about a clerk who is given $10,000 to deposit at the bank, but the bank is closed for the night so he tries to get to the bank president's house with the money.

Cast

Preservation
Prints of The Perfect Clown are held in the collections of the Cineteca Italiana (Milan), Museum of Modern Art (New York City), UCLA Film and Television Archive (Los Angeles), and Academy Film Archive (Beverly Hills).

See also
 List of American films of 1925

References

External links

 (film with Spanish titles)

1925 films
American silent feature films
American slapstick comedy films
1925 comedy films
American black-and-white films
Films directed by Fred C. Newmeyer
1920s American films
Silent American comedy films